is a station on the Hiroden Miyajima Line, located in Sagatahonmachi, Hatsukaichi, Hiroshima.

Routes
From Sanyo-jogakuen-mae Station, there is one of Hiroden Streetcar routes.
 Hiroshima Station - Hiroden-miyajima-guchi Route

Connections
█ Miyajima Line

Rakurakuen — Sanyo-jogakuen-mae — Hiroden-hatsukaichi

Around station
Sanyo Women's College
Sanyo girls' junior / senior high school

History
Opened as "Sanyo-jogakuen" on December 24, 1950.
Renamed to "Sanyo-joshidai-mae" on April 1, 1963.
Renamed to "Sanyo-jogakuen-mae" on April 1, 2019.

See also
Hiroden Streetcar Lines and Routes

References

Hiroden Miyajima Line stations
Railway stations in Japan opened in 1950